"The Ballad of Spiro Agnew" was originally written and performed by Tom Paxton.  It was covered by John Denver on his 1969 album Rhymes & Reasons.

It is a very short song, clocking in at around eighteen seconds.

The song makes fun of Spiro Agnew by saying that he has accomplished nothing.

The full lyrics are, "I'll sing you a song of Spiro Agnew and all the things he's done."

References

Pop ballads
Songs written by Tom Paxton
1960s ballads